Yin Kesheng (March 1932 – 19 May 2011) was a Chinese politician who served as Communist Party Secretary of Qinghai from 1985 to 1997.

He was a member of the 12th, 13th and 14th Central Committee of the Chinese Communist Party. He was a delegate to the 8th National People's Congress and a member of the Standing Committee of the 9th National People's Congress.

Biography
Yin was born in Tong County, Hebei (now Tongzhou District, Beijing), in March 1932.

He entered the workforce in March 1949, and joined the Chinese Communist Party (CCP) in June 1953. In 1956, he was assigned to the Qinghai Provincial Petroleum Bureau, and eventually becoming its director in 1979. In February 1983, he was admitted to member of the Standing Committee of the CCP Qinghai Provincial Committee, the province's top authority. Two months later, he was appointed vice governor of Qinghai. In July 1985, he was promoted to party secretary, the top political position in the province, and held that office until March 1997. 

In March 1998, he took office as vice chairperson of the National People's Congress Ethnic Affairs Committee, serving in the post until his retirement in March 2003.

On 19 May 2011, he died from an illness in Beijing, at the age of 79.

References

1932 births
2011 deaths
China University of Petroleum alumni
People's Republic of China politicians from Beijing
Chinese Communist Party politicians from Beijing
Delegates to the 8th National People's Congress
Members of the Standing Committee of the 9th National People's Congress
Members of the 12th Central Committee of the Chinese Communist Party
Members of the 13th Central Committee of the Chinese Communist Party
Members of the 14th Central Committee of the Chinese Communist Party